Pogonopygia nigralbata is a moth of the family Geometridae. It is found in Peninsular Malaysia, Sumatra, Borneo, Japan, the north-eastern Himalaya, northern Vietnam and Luzon.

The wingspan is 46–53 mm.

The larvae feed on Illicium species in Japan.

Subspecies
Pogonopygia nigralbata nigralbata (Japan, north-eastern Himalaya, northern Vietnam, Luzon)
Pogonopygia nigralbata attenuata Warren, 1897 (Peninsular Malaysia, Sumatra, Borneo)

External links
The Moths of Borneo
Moths of Japan

Boarmiini
Moths of Japan
Moths described in 1894